Coleophora nevadella is a moth of the family Coleophoridae. It is found in Spain and France, where it is found in the eastern Pyrénées.

Adults occur in July on blooming Nepeta latifolia plants, which is the likely oviposition (egg laying) host plant.

References

nevadella
Moths described in 1985
Moths of Europe